Vibrio campbellii is a Gram-negative, curved rod-shaped, marine bacterium closely related to its sister species, Vibrio harveyi. It is an emerging pathogen in aquatic organisms.

Biology
Quorum sensing allows the bacterium to communicate with autoinducers, a chemical signaling molecule that is secreted. Some strains of V. campellii are known to be not luminescent; these strains are thought to be less virulent than the luminescent strains.
Bioluminescence in bacteria is due to the reaction:

FMNH− + H+ + RCHO + O2 → FMN + RCOOH + H2O + hν

and is catalyzed by the enzyme luciferase.  A new luciferase was isolated from V. campbellii (Lux_Vc) and is similar to that of the Lux_Vh found in V. harveyi, but is more thermodynamically stable due to the binding of reduced FMN.

The V. campbellii strains PEL22A, BAA-1116, AND4 are known to be mixotrophic or more specifically  photo(organo)heterotrophic. This is considered a rare phenotype in Vibrio and is thought to be caused by their exploitation of lateral gene transfer during adaptation.

Pathogenesis
The causes of virulence can vary depending on different strains. The strain did contain  gene which codes for hemolysin, an endotoxin found in most Vibrio species.

References

External links
Type strain of Vibrio campbellii at BacDive -  the Bacterial Diversity Metadatabase

Gram-negative bacteria
Bacteria described in 1981
Vibrionales